Kangars may refer to one of the following.

A character from Lāčplēsis Latvian epic
Chris Kangars, an Australian rules footballer
Kangar people, Kangars, an ancient Turkic tribe

See also
Kangar
Kangarli (disambiguation)